Circuit de Croix-en-Ternois is a race track near Croix-en-Ternois, France.

The circuit is used very regularly for various car and bike race meetings, and is also frequently open for track days. The circuit is also used by the British Motorcycle Racing Club as a round of their annual race calendar.

Lap records

The official race lap records at the Circuit de Croix-en-Ternois are listed as:

References

External links

Motorsport venues in France
Sports venues in Pas-de-Calais